Statistics of the 1998-1999 Saudi Premier League.

Stadia and locations

Final league table

Playoffs

Semifinals

Final

External links
 RSSSF Stats
 Saudi Arabia Football Federation
 Saudi League Statistics

Saudi Premier League seasons
Saudi Professional League
Professional League